Lieutenant General Choummaly Sayasone (Lao: ຈູມມະລີ ໄຊຍະສອນ; born 6 March 1936) is a Laotian politician who was General Secretary (supreme leader) of the Lao People's Revolutionary Party (LPRP) and President of Laos (head of state) from 2006 to 2016.

History 
Choummaly Sayasone was born in Attapu. He joined the Party's Politburo in 1991 and was Minister of Defence from 1991 to 2001. Subsequently he was the third Vice President of Laos from 2001 to 2006.

He was elected as the LPRP's General Secretary on 21 March 2006, in the aftermath of the Party's 8th Congress, by the first plenum of the eighth Central Committee, succeeding Khamtai Siphandone as de facto leader of Laos. He subsequently succeeded Siphandon as the 6th President of Laos on 8 June 2006.

In March 2011, he was reelected to his position as the LPRP's General Secretary at the 9th LPRP Congress. In June 2011, he was re-elected as President of Laos at the seventh National Assembly. He did not seek re-election to the LPRP Central Committee at the 10th LPRP Congress in January 2016, indicating his retirement. Bounnhang Vorachit was elected to succeed him as General Secretary on 22 January 2016.

On 4 April 2021, Sayasone and his family were on a yacht in Nam Ngum Lake, when there was a storm and the vessel capsized. Although initially feared dead, Sayasone survived, but nine people died, including those of his wife, Keosaychay Sayasone, and his son.

References 

|-

|-

|-

1936 births
Heads of the Central Committee of the Lao People's Revolutionary Party
Members of the 3rd Central Committee of the Lao People's Revolutionary Party
Members of the 4th Central Committee of the Lao People's Revolutionary Party
Members of the 5th Central Committee of the Lao People's Revolutionary Party
Members of the 6th Central Committee of the Lao People's Revolutionary Party
Members of the 7th Central Committee of the Lao People's Revolutionary Party
Members of the 8th Central Committee of the Lao People's Revolutionary Party
Members of the 9th Central Committee of the Lao People's Revolutionary Party
Alternate members of the 4th Politburo of the Lao People's Revolutionary Party
Members of the 5th Politburo of the Lao People's Revolutionary Party
Members of the 6th Politburo of the Lao People's Revolutionary Party
Members of the 7th Politburo of the Lao People's Revolutionary Party
Members of the 8th Politburo of the Lao People's Revolutionary Party
Members of the 9th Politburo of the Lao People's Revolutionary Party
Members of the 4th Secretariat of the Lao People's Revolutionary Party
Members of the 9th Secretariat of the Lao People's Revolutionary Party
Lao People's Revolutionary Party politicians
Living people
People from Attapeu province
Presidents of Laos
Vice presidents of Laos
Deputy Prime Ministers of Laos
Defense Ministers of Laos
Laotian military leaders